Deûlémont (from ) is a commune in the Nord department in northern France. Situated at the confluence of the rivers Deûle and Lys, it is part of the Métropole Européenne de Lille.

Heraldry

See also
Communes of the Nord department

Notable people
Jules Leman (1826–1880), priest and schoolmaster

References

Communes of Nord (French department)
French Flanders